George Moss may refer to:

 George Moss (politician) (1913–1985), Australian politician
 George Moss (rapper) (born 1982), American Christian hip hop musician